Raduzhny (masculine), Raduzhnaya (feminine), or Raduzhnoye (neuter) may refer to:
Raduzhny (inhabited locality) (Raduzhnaya, Raduzhnoye), name of several inhabited localities in Russia
Raduzhny Urban Okrug, name of several urban okrugs in Russia